The 2019 OFC U-19 Women's Championship was the 9th edition of the OFC U-19/U-20 Women's Championship, the biennial international youth football championship organised by the Oceania Football Confederation (OFC) for the women's under-19/under-20 national teams of Oceania. The tournament was held in the Cook Islands from 30 August to 12 September 2019.

The winner of the tournament would have qualified for the 2021 FIFA U-20 Women's World Cup (originally 2020 but postponed due to COVID-19 pandemic) in Costa Rica as the OFC representatives. However, FIFA announced on 17 November 2020 that this edition of the World Cup would be cancelled.

New Zealand were the defending champions, and they went on to win the 2019 Championship.

Teams
All 11 FIFA-affiliated national teams from OFC entered the tournament.

Venue
The matches were played at the CIFA Academy Field, Rarotonga.

Squads

Players born on or after 1 January 2000 were eligible to compete in the tournament.

Draw
The draw of the tournament was held on 17 April 2019 at the OFC Academy in Auckland, New Zealand. The 11 teams were drawn into three groups, with Groups A and B having four teams and Group C having three teams. The hosts Cook Islands were assigned to group position A1, while the remaining teams were drawn into the other group positions without any seeding, with the only restriction that the defending champions New Zealand must be drawn into Group A or B.

Group stage
The winners of each group and the runners-up of Group B advanced to the semi-finals.

All times are local, CKT (UTC−10).

Group A

Group B

Group C

Knockout stage

Bracket

Semi-finals

Third place match

Final
Winner qualified for 2021 FIFA U-20 Women's World Cup.

Winners

Awards
The following awards were given at the conclusion of the tournament.

Goalscorers

Qualified teams for FIFA U-20 Women's World Cup
The following team from OFC would have qualified for the 2021 FIFA U-20 Women's World Cup before the tournament was cancelled.

1 Bold indicates champions for that year. Italic indicates hosts for that year.

References

External links
OFC U-19 Women's Championship 2019
News > OFC U-19 Women's Championship 2019, oceaniafootball.com

2019
2020 FIFA U-20 Women's World Cup qualification
2019 in women's association football
2019 in youth association football
U-19 Women's Championship
2019 OFC U-19 Women's Championship
August 2019 sports events in Oceania
September 2019 sports events in Oceania